K. Rajagopal may refer to:

K. Rajagopal (film editor) (born 1952), Indian film editor
Kuderu Rajagopal (born 1953), Indian educator and administrator
K. Rajagopal (footballer) (born 1956), Malaysian football manager
K. Rajagopal (director) (born 1965), Singaporean film director